Samoana bellula, common name the "Polynesian tree snail", is a species of tropical, air-breathing land snail, a terrestrial, pulmonate, gastropod mollusk in the family  Partulidae. This species is endemic to Ua Pou, Marquesas Islands, French Polynesia.

References

B
Fauna of French Polynesia
Molluscs of Oceania
Critically endangered fauna of Oceania